Florida State Road 869 (SR 869) is a  state road located in western and northern Broward County, acting as a de facto bypass of Fort Lauderdale as well as the northern coastal and southern parts of the county extending north from a junction of I-75 (SR 93), I-595 (SR 862) in Sunrise to Coral Springs where it heads eastward towards Florida's Turnpike and intersecting I-95 before terminating at Southwest 10th Avenue in Deerfield Beach. The  section west of the Turnpike is known as the Sawgrass Expressway, a six-lane, limited-access, all-electronic toll road; the  section east of the Turnpike is a surface street known as Southwest 10th Street. The expressway opened in 1986 and was added to Florida's Turnpike Enterprise in 1990.  The at-grade section east of the Turnpike is maintained by FDOT.

Route description
The highway begins at the north end of the I-75/I-595 interchange in Sunrise, with the Everglades to the west and newer residential and commercial developments to the east of the expressway for the first 12 miles. After a welcome sign, the expressway passes its lone free interchange to Sunrise Boulevard (SR 838), connecting to the Sawgrass Mills mall and passing through the Sunrise Toll Gantry, the first of two toll gantries on the road before reaching the exit for the BB&T Center, where the Florida Panthers of the National Hockey League play; this interchange has no southbound exit. After intersecting with Oakland Park Boulevard (SR 816), it enters Tamarac by intersecting with Commercial Boulevard (SR 870) and then enters Coral Springs.  After interchanges at Atlantic Blvd (SR 814) and Sample Road (SR 834), it curves 90 degrees east by switching to an east and west orientation with housing and other developments surrounding both sides of the highway. Still in Coral Springs, the highway's next interchange and last exit before additional tolls (both directions) is Coral Ridge Drive. Afterwards, it continues eastward, acting as the border between Parkland to the north of the expressway and Coral Springs to the south of it towards the interchange with University Drive (SR 817). Three miles east of this exit, the expressway has an interchange with US 441 / SR7, which forms the borders between Coconut Creek to the east and Parkland and Coral Springs to the west.  The expressway then enters Coconut Creek at the interchange with an exit with Lyons Road before entering Deerfield Beach and approaching the Deerfield Toll Gantry just west of Florida's Turnpike.

After crossing the Turnpike, the tollway reverts to a six lane surface street, Southwest 10th Street, still heading east in Deerfield Beach. It has intersections with two residential streets before reaching Powerline Road (SR 845). There have been plans to extend the expressway east of the Turnpike to I-95 since the early 1990s, but local opposition has prevented it from going forward. The latest (c.2018) plan features elevated express lanes 27' above the street similar to I-595 to the south, and construction could begin as early as 2022.

Tolls
The Sawgrass Expressway is an all electronic, cashless toll road, using overhead toll gantries in the place of the former toll plazas.  Users pay by either SunPass transponders or by a toll by plate system for a slightly higher fee.  The cost to travel the entire expressway costs $2.12 with SunPass, and $2.64 with toll by plate as of July 2015.  For travel over only part of the expressway, a graduated toll system is in place.

History

Originally planned to be the University-Deerfield Expressway when it was first proposed in 1960, it was supposed to be the northernmost part of a chain of expressways from Deerfield Beach to Coral Gables, but the proposed Snake Creek Expressway (in Broward County) became part of the Florida's Turnpike Extension and the LeJeune-Douglas Expressway (in Dade County) failed in the 1970s as the result of a county wide expressway revolt. On the other hand, the rerouting of Interstate 75 from the Tamiami Trail to Alligator Alley in 1973 increased the necessity of a northern/western bypass of Broward County and in 1983, the newly created Broward County Expressway Authority proposed the Sawgrass-Deerfield Expressway in its current alignment.  A series of cost-cutting measures for the proposed toll road included removal of all planned rest stops and a shortening of the name of the road to Sawgrass Expressway (A consultant stated in an interview, "Those overhead signs are damn expensive").

The Sawgrass Expressway broke ground on November 2, 1984, and opened to traffic on July 3, 1986, at a cost of $200 million.  The section between I-75 and Sunrise Boulevard opened on August 4, 1988.   Bonds were sold in 1984 to finance construction and again in 1986 to partially refund the 1984 bonds.  By 1990, however, the Sawgrass Expressway was plagued with a massive debt, light usage and was a subject of local political corruption.  The Florida Department of Transportation purchased the Sawgrass Expressway from the Broward County Expressway Authority in December 1990 as part of the expansion program authorized by the Florida Legislature in 1990 Senate Bill 1316.  The Expressway, along with SW 10th Street west of I-95, was bannered as State Road 869 in 1995.

 When the highway was first built, it was criticized for being a "road to nowhere", as it passed through undeveloped areas for most of its length. The road's $1.50 toll in its first few years was another criticism by local residents, contributing to the road's light usage. Commercial and residential developments boomed along the toll road in the late '80s and throughout the '90s, making it suitable for commuters. The swampland west of the Expressway is an Everglades Water Conservation Area and unlikely to be developed in the foreseeable future.

The Sawgrass Expressway experienced its first toll hike on March 7, 2004, increasing the toll rate for non SunPass users to $2.00 for travel over the entire expressway, with SunPass users still using the original toll rates.

Unlike most roads, the Sawgrass Expressway had a mascot, a swamp frog named Cecil B. Sawgrass, who appeared on signs greeting motorists entering the tollway southbound from State Road 845 (Powerline Road), as well as various road signs on the expressway. Signs featuring Cecil are becoming rare, as newer expressway signage uses only the standard TOLL 869 shield. In October 2005, Hurricane Wilma damaged the expressway's welcome sign, resulting in its removal during cleanup.

Between 2008 and 2009, the expressway was widened from four lanes to its current six lanes, and was converted to open-road tolling at the Sunrise and Deerfield toll plazas, as well as on exit and entrance ramps, eliminating the need for toll plazas for SunPass users on the toll road.  Traditional toll booths for cash customers were still accessible on the right side of the plaza areas.

On June 24, 2012, toll rates were raised on the Sawgrass Expressway, with rates going up on average about a quarter at each tolling area for both cash and SunPass customers.  Rates were risen slightly again for SunPass customers on July 1, 2013, with cash prices staying at their 2012 rates, and are the toll rates as of January 2014.

The Sawgrass Expressway eliminated cash tolls on April 19, 2014, charging vehicles by SunPass or license plate information. Toll gantries replaced the shuttered toll booths at plazas and exits.

Exit list

References

External links
Florida @ SouthEastRoads - Florida 869
Florida's Turnpike - Toll 869 - Sawgrass Expressway
Sawgrass Expressway Map

869
869
869
Deerfield Beach, Florida